The Church Missionary Society Training College in Islington, north London was founded in 1820 to prepare Anglican missionaries of the Church Missionary Society for work overseas. Prior to the establishment of the College the CMS missionaries received their training under Thomas Scott.

Location
Initially the college operated out of the family home of the Revd. Edward Bickersteth, but by 1825 the college had moved to purpose-built accommodation in Upper Street, Islington with classrooms and living accommodation for students and a professional staff. The new premises was designed to teach around 20 students to pass bishops' ordination examinations, tutoring them in Latin, Greek, English composition, sermon writing, and Divinity.

Activities
By 1894, the Church Missionary Society College had trained about 600 missionaries.

The growth of training establishments overseas, widened university access and the start of the First World War led to the college's closure in 1915.

Principals
 the Rev. J. N. Pearson (1825–38)
 the Rev. C. F. Childe (1838–58)
 the Rev. T. Green (1858–70)
 the Rev. A. H. Frost (1870–74)
 the Rev. W. H. Barlow (1875–82)
 the Rev. T. W. Drury (1882–99)

References

Educational institutions established in 1820
Educational institutions disestablished in 1915
Anglican seminaries and theological colleges
Former theological colleges in England
Education in the London Borough of Islington